Fernando Enevoldsen (born 26 March 1965) is an Argentine alpine skier. He competed in two events at the 1984 Winter Olympics.

References

1965 births
Living people
Argentine male alpine skiers
Olympic alpine skiers of Argentina
Alpine skiers at the 1984 Winter Olympics
Sportspeople from Bariloche